Waterford City was a United Kingdom parliamentary constituency, in southeast Ireland.

Boundaries and boundary changes
As the constituency for the parliamentary borough of Waterford in County Waterford, it returned one MP from 1801 to 1832, two from 1832 to 1885 and one from 1885 to 1922. It was an original constituency represented in Parliament when the Union of Great Britain and Ireland took effect on 1 January 1801.

In 1918, the boundary was redefined to exclude the Kilculliheen area which had been transferred to County Kilkenny under the Local Government (Ireland) Act 1898. It was defined as consisting of the county borough of Waterford and the district electoral divisions of Ballynakill, Kilbarry, Killoteran and Waterford Rural in the rural district of Waterford.

Following the dissolution of parliament in 1922 the area was no longer represented in the United Kingdom House of Commons.

Politics
The constituency was a predominantly Nationalist area in 1918. The seat was contested by William Redmond, the son of the IPP leader John Redmond whom he replaced in the Waterford City constituency in a by-election held in March 1918. In the general election of December 1918, it was the only Irish seat the IPP won outside Ulster.

The First Dáil
Sinn Féin contested the general election of 1918 on the platform that instead of taking up any seats they won in the United Kingdom Parliament, they would establish a revolutionary assembly in Dublin. In republican theory every MP elected in Ireland was a potential Deputy to this assembly. In practice only the Sinn Féin members accepted the offer.

The revolutionary First Dáil assembled on 21 January 1919 and last met on 10 May 1921. The First Dáil, according to a resolution passed on 10 May 1921, was formally dissolved on the assembling of the Second Dáil. This took place on 16 August 1921.

In 1921 Sinn Féin used the UK authorised elections for the Northern Ireland House of Commons and the House of Commons of Southern Ireland as a poll for the Irish Republic's Second Dáil. This area was part of the five-seat Dáil constituency of Waterford–Tipperary East.

Members of Parliament

MPs 1801–32

MPs 1832–85 

Representation increased to two members

MPs 1885–1918 
Representation reduced to one member'''Elections
The single-member elections in this constituency took place using the first past the post electoral system. Multi-member elections used the plurality-at-large voting system.

Elections in the 1830s

Wyse was appointed as a Commissioner of the Treasury, requiring a by-election.

Elections in the 1840s

 

  
  

On petition, Christmas and Reade were unseated and Wyse and Barron were declared elected on 13 June 1842.

 
 
 
   

O'Connell resigned by accepting the office of Steward of the Chiltern Hundreds, causing a by-election.

 
 
  

Elections in the 1850s

 

  
  

 

  
  

 
  

Elections in the 1860s

 

  

 
 
  

Blake resigned after he was appointed inspector of Irish fisheries, causing a by-election.

  
 

Elections in the 1870s
Barron was unseated on petition, causing a by-election.

 

 

 

Elections in the 1880s

 

Elections in the 1890s
Power died, causing a by-election.

Elections in the 1900s

Elections in the 1910s

See also
List of United Kingdom Parliament constituencies in Ireland and Northern Ireland
Redistribution of Seats (Ireland) Act 1918
List of MPs elected in the 1918 United Kingdom general election
Historic Dáil constituencies
Members of the 1st Dáil

References

Sources
GITHENS-MAZER, Jonathan. Myths and Memories of the Easter Rising, Cultural and Political Nationalism in Ireland. Dublin and Portland, OR: Irish Academic Press, 2006, 238p.The Parliaments of England'' by Henry Stooks Smith (1st edition published in three volumes 1844–50), 2nd edition edited (in one volume) by F.W.S. Craig (Political Reference Publications 1973)

External links
 History of Parliament: Constituencies 1790–1820

Notes and References

Westminster constituencies in County Waterford (historic)
Waterford City
Constituencies of the Parliament of the United Kingdom established in 1801
Constituencies of the Parliament of the United Kingdom disestablished in 1922
History of Waterford (city)
Politics of Waterford (city)